Die Young is the first official studio album by Pennsylvania hardcore punk band Wisdom In Chains. It was released in 2005 on Spook City Records, and re-issued in 2007 on Eulogy Recordings with new cover art.

Track listing

Appears on 2007 reissue

References

2005 albums
Wisdom in Chains albums